Lyubomirovka is a rural locality in Vyshnederevensky Selsoviet Rural Settlement, Lgovsky District, Kursk Oblast, Russia. Population:

Geography 
The village is located on the Apoka River (a left tributary of the Seym), 39 km from the Russia–Ukraine border, 68 km south-west of Kursk, 9.5 km south of the district center – the town Lgov, 4 km from the selsoviet center – Vyshniye Derevenki.

 Climate
Lyubomirovka has a warm-summer humid continental climate (Dfb in the Köppen climate classification).

Transport 
Lyubomirovka is located 6 km from the road of regional importance  (Kursk – Lgov – Rylsk – border with Ukraine), 1.5 km from the road  (Lgov – Sudzha), on the road of intermunicipal significance  (38K-024 – Maleyevka – Lyubomirovka), 7.5 km from the nearest railway halt 387 km (railway line 322 km – Lgov I).

The rural locality is situated 75 km from Kursk Vostochny Airport, 138 km from Belgorod International Airport and 277 km from Voronezh Peter the Great Airport.

References

Notes

Sources

Rural localities in Lgovsky District